Théophile David (born 15 December 1963) is a Swiss butterfly swimmer. He competed at the 1984 Summer Olympics and the 1988 Summer Olympics.

References

External links
 

1963 births
Living people
Swiss male butterfly swimmers
Olympic swimmers of Switzerland
Swimmers at the 1984 Summer Olympics
Swimmers at the 1988 Summer Olympics
Place of birth missing (living people)
20th-century Swiss people